Michele Steele (born October 2, 1978) is an American television anchor and reporter for ESPN.

Early years
She attended the University of Illinois, where she earned a bachelor's degree in economics and Columbia University, where she earned a master's degree in journalism.

Career
She was a daily contributor for Forbes on Fox along with being the senior reporter for Forbes' video on-demand service. She was hired as the only sports reporter for the Bloomberg Television Network. On December 2, 2011, it was announced that she was leaving Bloomberg to join ESPN, where she has been since. At ESPN, she is a cross-platform anchor and reporter, primarily doing live remote reports for most major sports.

References

External links
 

1978 births
Living people
American television reporters and correspondents